Royal Goode (1 September 1913 – 3 September 1978) was a Swedish chess player and Swedish Chess Championship silver medal winner (1954).

Biography
In the 1950s, Royal Goode was one of Sweden's leading chess players. In Swedish Chess Championships he won the silver medal in 1954, having been tied for 1st place and ultimately losing an additional match against Bengt-Eric Hörberg - 1:2.

Royal Goode represented Sweden in the Chess Olympiad:
 In 1954, at second reserve board in the 11th Chess Olympiad in Amsterdam (+0, =3, -6).

References

External links

Royal Goode chess games at 365chess.com

1913 births
1978 deaths
Swedish chess players
Chess Olympiad competitors
20th-century chess players